The Sub Junior National Football Championship, also known as Mir Iqbal Hussain Trophy, is an Indian football tournament for players under 16 years of age. The competition is held every year between the under-16 teams representing states of India. The tournament was started in 1977 for boys under the age 15 years. The tournament was constituted at the Darjeeling meeting of the AIFF on 12 June 1976. AIFF donated the trophy in the memory of former President of Karnataka State Football Association, Mir Iqbal Hussain.

From the 2009–10 season onwards, the championship has been sponsored by Coca-Cola and was rechristened as the Coca-Cola MIHT for a period of three years. This also saw a change in the format of the tournament where there are three different levels before the selection of national team. At national level, a total of 12 state teams compete to decide the national winner state.

The 32nd edition of Sub-junior National Football Championship was conducted in 2009 with the new format. Subsequently, tournament has been held from last three years with similar format.

Conduct and format 
The three levels of the tournament are as explained
1. District Level
The district football association would select a team of 16 players from among all the young footballers to represent the state at zonal level tournament. This would be done through Inter-School competitions conducted between participating school teams in each district.
2. Zonal Level
All the state teams will be divided into 5 zones. The state teams from each zone would play in a tournament at a zonal level. The top 2 teams will qualify for the National finals.
3. National Level
Total 12 teams - 10 teams (2 from each zones) plus the last years winners and the home team would compete at the National finals. Each team would then play in a round robin format. The top four teams with the maximum points would advance to the Semi-Final stage, two of them would progress to the Final Stage. The winning team would be rewarded the Coca-Cola Mir Iqal Hussain Trophy. At the National Finals, AIFF would identify and select 40 of the most promising football talent. These 40 footballers would be groomed by AIFF to become the Official National Under-16 Sub-Junior Team.

Results
The following is the list of winners and runners-up:

See also 

 List of football clubs in India
 India national football team
 India women's national football team
 India national under-19 football team
 India national under-20 football team
 India national under-23 football team
 M. Dutta Ray Trophy
 BC Roy Trophy

References

External links 
https://web.archive.org/web/20110716215106/http://www.the-aiff.com/pages/tournament/tournament-event.php?tournamentdetail=53

Football cup competitions in India
Youth football in India
Youth football competitions